Newton Blossomville is a village in the unitary authority area of the City of Milton Keynes, Buckinghamshire, England. It is a civil parish, sharing a joint parish council with Clifton Reynes.  At the 2011 census, the population of the parish was 329, an increase of 17.5%  on the 280 figure for 2001

It is located in the north of the Borough, about two and a half miles east of Olney & quarter of a mile from the Bucks/Beds border, just outside the village.

The village name 'Newton' is an Old English language word meaning 'new village' or 'new homestead'.  It was recorded in the Domesday Book of 1086 under the holdings of Clifton Reynes (Clystone) as not much was left of the original settlement.  Called 'Niwetone' when first named independently in 1175, it gained the affix 'Blossevill', referring to the family name of the lords of the manor in the 13th century.

Services

Today, the main services remaining in the village are the Newton Blossomville Church of England 1st School and the Old Mill public house (previously The Old Mill Burned Down). The village post office has been closed for many years, as is common for other villages of this size. The nearest railway station, in Turvey, was closed when the Bedford to Northampton Line  was closed in the 1960s; although some of the line remains, it is unused and overgrown, although a section is used as a private access from the village to a farm in Spring Lane, Clifton Reynes.

Notable former inhabitants
Sir Thomas Armstrong
Rosemary Rapaport

References

External links
 'Newton Blossomville', Victoria History of the Counties of England: A History of the County of Buckingham: Volume 4 (1927), pp. 422–425.

Villages in Buckinghamshire
Areas of Milton Keynes
Civil parishes in Buckinghamshire